The 2010–11 Maryland Terrapins men's basketball team represented the University of Maryland in the 2010–11 college basketball season as a member of the Atlantic Coast Conference (ACC). The team was led by 22nd-year head coach Gary Williams and played their home games at the Comcast Center. They finished the season 19–14, 7–9 in ACC play and lost in the quarterfinals of the ACC tournament to Duke. They were not invited to the post season NCAA or NIT tournaments, and announced that they would decline invitations to any other event.

Against Clemson, sophomore center Jordan Williams recorded his 13th consecutive double-double, which broke the school record set by Len Elmore in 1974.

Pre-season

Recruiting

Accolades
Team
Atlantic Coast Conference preseason #6 team.

Jordan Williams
John R. Wooden Award candidate.

Roster

Schedule 

|-
!colspan=12 style=| Exihibtion

|-
!colspan=12 style=| Regular season

|-
!colspan=12 style=| ACC tournament

Rankings

References

Maryland Terrapins men's basketball seasons
Maryland Terrapins
Terra
Terra